Banda do Mar is a Portuguese Brazilian band announced in May 2014 by Marcelo Camelo (vocals/guitar), his wife Mallu Magalhães (vocals/guitar) and Fred Ferreira (drums). The name of the band is Portuguese for "Band of the Sea".

Their debut eponymous album was released in August 2014 and they went on tour since then  in support of the record. On August 24, 2015, the band announced they were going on hiatus after the last concert of the tour, held in Lisbon on September 9, 2015.

Mallu and Marcelo have been working together in their respective solo careers since they began dating in 2008, when Mallu sang "Janta" on Marcelo's debut solo album, Sou. "Janta" was chosen by Rolling Stone Brasil as the best Brazilian track that year. Later, in 2011, Marcelo Camelo produced Mallu's third album, Pitanga.

Discography 
Studio Albums

Singles

Band members
 Current Members
 Marcelo Camelo - lead vocals, guitar
 Mallu Magalhães - lead vocals, guitar, shaker
 Fred Ferreira - drums

 Touring Members
 Gabriel Bubu - guitar
 Marcos Gerez - bass

References 

Musical groups established in 2013
Bossa nova musicians
People from Lisbon
2013 establishments in Brazil